Mine is a 2021 South Korean television series directed by Lee Na-jung, and starring Lee Bo-young, Kim Seo-hyung, Lee Hyun-wook, and Ok Ja-yeon. The story revolves around strong women who free themselves from the prejudices of society to find their true 'mine'. It also concerns the lives of members of a wealthy family and their servants. Mine is the first Korean drama to feature a lesbian as a lead character.

The series premiered on tvN on May 8, 2021, and aired every Saturday and Sunday from 21:00 (KST) until June 27, 2021. Netflix acquired the exclusive rights to international distribution.

It ended on June 27 with an average viewership of 8.208% nationwide and 9.078% for the metropolitan area, and an average viewership of 1.826 million audience per episode. The last episode recorded an average of 10.5% and 11.2% for households nationwide and metropolitan area respectively, breaking its own highest ratings in both segments.

Synopsis
The series glimpses into the high society's lifestyle and follows strong and ambitious women who are trying to find their real 'mine'.

Seo Hi-soo, a former top actress and now the second daughter-in-law of the Hyowon Group chaebol, and Jung Seo-hyun, the first daughter-in-law of Hyowon Group, are trying to find their true identities.

Cast

Main
 Lee Bo-young as Seo Hi-soo, former top actress and Hyowon Group's second daughter-in-law
 Kim Seo-hyung as Jung Seo-hyun, Hyowon Group's first daughter-in-law and director of Seohyun Gallery 
 Cho Hye-won as young Jung Seo-hyun 
 Ok Ja-yeon as Kang Ja-kyung, Han Ha-joon's tutor

Supporting

Hyowon family
 Lee Hyun-wook as Han Ji-yong, second son of the Hyowon family and Seo Hi-soo's husband
 Park Hyuk-kwon as Han Jin-ho, eldest son of the Hyowon family and Jung Seo-hyun's husband
 Cha Hak-yeon as Han Soo-hyuk, Han Jin-ho's son from his first marriage and Jung Seo-hyun's stepson
Jung Hyeon-jun as Han Ha-joon, Han Ji-yong's son from a previous relationship and Seo Hi-soo's stepson
 Park Won-sook as Yang Soon-hye, mother-in-law of Jung Seo-hyun and Seo Hi-soo
Jung Dong-hwan as Chairman Han Suk-chul, father-in-law of Jung Seo-hyun and Seo Hi-soo
Kim Hye-hwa as Han Jin-hee, only daughter of the Hyowon family
Jo Eun-sol as Park Jung-do, Han Jin-hee's husband

Hyowon Mansion's staff
 Jung Yi-seo as Kim Yu-yeon, an orphan who used to be a teacher at the Ilsin Foundation and the new housemaid at Cadenza
 Park Sung-yeon as Butler Joo, she is responsible for management and housekeeping at Hyowon Mansion
Lee Joong-ok as Kim Seong-tae, the only male staff member at Hyowon Mansion
 Jo Yoon-seo as Oh Soo-young, Seo Hi-soo's personal assistant
Yoon Seon-ah as Hwang Gyeong-hye, a housemaid
Kim Nam-jin as Ko Mi-jin, a housemaid

People around the Hyowon family
 Ye Soo-jung as Mother Emma/Seol-hwa, founder of Ilsin Foundation, who acts as therapist for members of the Hyowon family
 Kim Jung-hwa as Suzy Choi, a painter and Jung Seo-hyun's first love
 Choi Soo-im as Kim Mi-ja, Chairman Han's dead mistress and Han Ji-yong's biological mother
 Song Seon-mi as Seo Jin-kyeong, mistress of Yang Soon-hye's older brother and director of Hawon Gallery
 Jang Ha-eun as Roh A-rim, eldest granddaughter of the Yeongwon Group and Han Soo-hyuk's intended fiancée

Hyowon Group's employees
 Kim Woo-dam as Secretary Seo, Jung Seo-hyun's secretary
Lee Ho-suk as Secretary Jo, Han Ji-yong's secretary
Ma Jung-pil as Secretary Cha
Park Sang-yong as member of the Legal Team
Kim Soo-hyun as member of the PR Team

Others
Choi Young-joon as Baek Dong-hun, a detective
Ahn Ji-hye as deputy director of Seohyun Gallery
Kim Yoon-ji as Jasmin, a member of the Bible study group
Oh Jung-yeon as Mi-joo, a member of the Bible study group
Song Seung-hwan as autistic teen artist
Kim Ji-woo as Ji-won, Han Ha-joon's classmate
Kwon So-hyun as Ji-won's mother
Gil Geum-seung as Mr. Kwak, an underground fighter

Production
In October 2020, it was reported that writer Baek Mi-kyeong and director Lee Na-jung were in talks with Lee Bo-young and Kim Seo-hyung for appearing in a women oriented drama initially known as 'Blue Diamond'.

On 29 December, tvN channel reported that Lee Bo-young, Kim Seo-hyung, Ok Ja-yeon, Park Hyuk-kwon and Park Won-sook confirmed their appearance in the drama, and Ko So-young, who has earlier received the proposal has refused the appearance due to scheduling conflicts.

Cha Hak-yeon joined the cast in January 2021.

On March 25, stills from script reading were released by the production crew.

Awards and nominations

Episodes

Original soundtrack

Part 1

Part 2

Part 3

Part 4

Part 5

Viewership
Audience response
As per Nielsen Korea, the last (16th) episode aired on June 27, 2021 logged a national average viewership of 10.512% with 2.42 million viewers watching the episode, thereby breaking its own highest ratings.

References

External links
  
 Mine at Daum 
 Mine at Naver 
 
 
 

2021 South Korean television series debuts
2021 South Korean television series endings
Korean-language television shows
South Korean LGBT-related television shows
South Korean mystery television series
South Korean thriller television series
Lesbian-related television shows
Korean-language Netflix exclusive international distribution programming
Television series by Studio Dragon
Television series by JS Pictures
TVN (South Korean TV channel) television dramas